Class D6 (formerly Class K, pre-1895) on the Pennsylvania Railroad was a class of  4-4-0 steam locomotive.
Nineteen were built by the PRR's Altoona Works (now owned by Norfolk Southern) between 1881–1883.  They were equipped with  drivers.
Seven were later converted to  drivers and classified D6a.

The D6 was one of the first American 4-4-0s to place the firebox above, rather than between, the locomotive's frames.

The innovation was not wholly new, having been first seen on the Philadelphia and Reading Railroad's 1859 Vera Cruz, designed by James Milholland of that road and built in their own shops; the Reading used this design until the invention of the Wootten firebox in 1877.
It was subsequently adopted by the Baldwin Locomotive Works in 1881 for six locomotives constructed for the Central of New Jersey; these were followed by the Pennsylvania Railroad locomotives, which garnered more attention for this design feature, in addition to having larger drivers than most previous 4-4-0s.

References

4-4-0 locomotives
D06
Railway locomotives introduced in 1881
Scrapped locomotives
Standard gauge locomotives of the United States
Steam locomotives of the United States